Aranga is a municipality in the autonomous community of Galicia, Spain in the province of A Coruña with an area of 120.49 km² (46.52 mi²), population of 2,181 inhabitants (INE, 2008). It is situated in the comarca of Betanzos.

References

Municipalities in the Province of A Coruña